Amritha Kalyani is a rāga in Carnatic music(musical scale of South Indian classical music) created by music composer  who has created many ragas. It is the Janya raga of 65th melakarta rāgam Mechakalyani in the 72 melakarta rāgam system of Carnatic music.

It is equivalent to Lydian mode of western music but the second and sixth note is omitted in ascending. This rāgam is also named as Amrith Kalyan Hindustani music.

Structure and Lakshana 

Amritha Kalyani is an asymmetric rāgam does not contain rishabham and dhaivatam in the ascending scale. It is an audava-sampurna rāgam (or owdava rāgam, meaning pentatonic ascending scale). Its  structure (ascending and descending scale) is as follows.

 : 
 : 

The notes used in this scale are shadjam, chatushūruti rishabam, antara gandharam, prati madhyamam, chatushruti dhaivatam, kakali nishadam in the ascending, chatushruti rishabham and chatushruti daivatam added in descending scale. It is a audava - sampurna rāgam

Compositions 
The composition in this rāgam

Achyutam Keshavam - composed by Mahesh Mahadev, sung by Priyadarshini

Ragapravaham - Ganesh Kumaresh

Notes

References 

Janya ragas